Jan Wasserbauer (born January 5, 1993) is a Czech professional ice hockey player.

Wasserbauer made his Czech Extraliga debut for HC Kometa Brno during the 2012–13 Czech Extraliga season. His last appearance for the club was in the 2014-15 season.

References

External links

1993 births
Living people
Czech ice hockey forwards
HC Kometa Brno players
SK Horácká Slavia Třebíč players
BK Havlíčkův Brod players
People from Žďár nad Sázavou
Sportspeople from the Vysočina Region